The 1945–46 Montreal Canadiens season was the Canadiens' 37th season of play. The Canadiens placed first during the regular season to qualify for the playoffs. The Canadiens defeated the Boston Bruins in the Stanley Cup Finals to win the Stanley Cup for the sixth time.

Regular season

Final standings

Record vs. opponents

Schedule and results

Playoffs

Stanley Cup Finals

Boston Bruins vs. Montreal Canadiens

Montreal wins best-of-seven series 4–1.

Player statistics

Regular season
Scoring

Goaltending

Playoffs
Scoring

Goaltending

See also
 1945–46 NHL season

References
Canadiens on Hockey Database

Stanley Cup championship seasons
Montreal Canadiens seasons
Montreal
Montreal